These are The Official Charts Company UK Official Indie Chart number one hits of 1994.

See also
1994 in music

References

United Kingdom Indie Singles
Indie 1994
UK Indie Chart number-one singles